Matthew Levy (May 1848 – July 24, 1933) was a teacher and state legislator in Mississippi. He represented Madison County, Mississippi in the Mississippi House of Representatives in 1882 and 1883.

He studied at Alcorn University. He opposed discriminatory voter registration laws. He lived in Jackson, Mississippi and was a pallbearer for lawyer John F. Harris of Greenville, Mississippi. He married Cornelia Jones. He eventually moved to Liberty, Arkansas, and is buried at the Peters Cemetery in Lee County, Arkansas.

He may have been a son of Chapman Levy.

References

19th-century American politicians
Members of the Mississippi House of Representatives
1848 births
1933 deaths
Alcorn State University alumni
People from Lee County, Arkansas
Politicians from Jackson, Mississippi